Tanner–Hiller Airport,  in Barre, Massachusetts, is a public airport owned by the G&C Group of Acton, MA, who purchased the field from the Leonard A. Tanner Estate in May 2017. It has one runway, averages 30 flights per week, and has approximately 25 aircraft and hang gliders based on the field. During the summer months the airport is home to hang gliding operations and extensive ultralight activity. The airport sits adjacent to the Ware River and near to the town of New Braintree.

History
The airport began operations in 1946, and is named after two of its owners, Fred and Catherine Hiller, and Leonard Tanner. The airport was originally opened by the Hillers. After Fred died, Catherine continued to develop a flight school business at the airport, both as an instructor and as an FAA examiner. A series of different owners passed through between 1973 and 1980, until Leonard Tanner bought it. One of the more interesting aircraft that has called the airport home was the prototype of the Lockheed YO-3A quiet observation aircraft, a type later used during the Vietnam War. It too was restored in a hangar at the airport before moving on. Leonard Tanner died in 1998 and his estate continued to operate the airport.
The airport had been deteriorating in recent years, something that was particularly apparent in the poor condition of the runway. The surroundings, however are still picturesque. There are no services provided at the airport as of November 2015. In its heyday the airport was home to many activities and businesses. Camping, swimming, a fine restaurant, and aircraft maintenance were once part of daily operations. Fuel sales also ceased in 2015.
In May 2017, after many years of being offered for sale, the airport was purchased for a reported US$1.1 million by G&C Group of Acton, MA, a subsidiary of a large flight school in China. The estate had had several offers prior to that, but the manager of the estate preferred to hold out for what he hoped would be better offers. The final decision to sell was accelerated by the departure of the airport's long time manager, Burchard Aviation, who also operated an aircraft maintenance shop in one of the dilapidated hangars. The new owners plan to open a helicopter school after some years.

Services
Hang Glide New England is a hang gliding tandem and instruction business that operates between May and October. The Silver Wings Ultralight Club is also very active and occupies the west hangar.

References

External links

Airports in Worcester County, Massachusetts
Buildings and structures in Barre, Massachusetts